Winners Never Quit is the second album by Pedro the Lion. It was released on March 28, 2000 on Jade Tree Records. Although David Bazan played all of the instruments on the album, Trey Many (drums) and Josh Golden (bass) joined Bazan on tour later that year.

Track listing
 "Slow and Steady Wins the Race" – 3:44
 "Simple Economics"  – 4:22
 "To Protect the Family Name"  – 5:29
 "A Mind of Her Own"  – 3:56
 "Never Leave a Job Half Done"  – 3:12
 "Eye on the Finish Line"  – 4:37
 "Bad Things to Such Good People"  – 3:24
 "Winners Never Quit"  – 5:16
Japanese bonus track:
 "Slow and Steady Wins the Race (alternate version with Ben Gibbard)" - 3:20

All songs by David Bazan except #3 (written with Chris Pugmire)

Notes and references 

Pedro the Lion albums
2000 albums
Rock operas
Jade Tree (record label) albums